Bayview Heights may refer to:

Bayview Heights, Queensland, Australia
Bayview Heights (Duluth), Minnesota, United States
Bayview Heights, Saskatchewan, Canada